Dionýz Ďurišin (October 16, 1929 – January 26, 1997) was a leading Slovak literary theorist and comparativist of Ukrainian origin. He belonged to the Slovak School of Comparative Literature. He worked in the tradition of the Czech and Slovak schools of comparative literature. He is renowned for developing the notions of world literature, and specifically, interliterary theory and processes, and interliterary communities.

Work
In his work Theory of Literary Comparatistics (1984), he defines "literary process" as the "inner laws of development of literature."  He elaborates upon the goal of literary studies, and comparative literature in particular, by noting: "To comprehend the literary phenomenon means not merely to describe its constituents, or to point out their mutual affinity and interdependence within the work of literature, but to reveal  the multifarious affinities of the literary phenomenon and the individual procedures with the social, cultural, artistic and literary background in the widest sense of the word" (p. 11). He notes that the ultimate goal of literary research was not "merely reconstruction of the laws of national literature as an organic literary-historical unit, but also the comprehension of the broader laws of the literary process, leading in the final result to the comprehension of the laws governing world literature" (p. 12). In the same book, Ďurišin claimed that he was developing the native Slovak tradition of criticism and developing ideas of theorists like Alexander Veselovsky and Viktor Zhirmunsky.

Selected bibliography

Books
 Ďurišin, Dionýz. Čo je svetová literatúra? (What Is World Literature?). Bratislava: Obzor, 1992.
 Ďurišin, Dionýz. Sources and Systematics of Comparative Literature. Trans. Peter Tkác. Bratislava: U Komenského, 1974.
 Ďurišin, Dionýz. Theory of Interliterary Process. Trans. Jessie Kocmanová and Zdenek Pistek. Bratislava: Slovak Academy of Sciences, 1989.
 Ďurišin, Dionýz. Theory of Literary Comparatistics. Trans. Jessie Kocmanová. Bratislava: Slovak Academy of Sciences, 1984. 
 Ďurišin, Dionýz. Vergleichende Literaturforschung. Versuch eines methodisch-theoretischen Grundrisses. Berlin: Akademie, 1976.
 Ďurišin, Dionýz, and Armando Gnisci, eds. Il Mediterraneo. Una rete interletteraria / La Médéterranée. Un Réseau interlittéraire / Sterdomorie medziliterárna siet. Roma: Bulzoni, 2000.

References

External links
Domínguez, César (2006). "Os horizontes da teoría interliteraria na Península Ibérica: recepción e campo de probas". Boletín Galego de Literatura. 34'''. 37-65. 
Domínguez, César (2007). "The Horizons of Interliterary Theory in the Iberian Peninsula: Reception and Testing Ground". The Horizons of Contemporary Slavic Comparative Literature Studies. Ed. Halina Janaszek-Ivanickova. Elipsa. 70-83. 
Domínguez, César (2012). "Dionyz Durisin and a Systemic Theory of World Literature". The Routledge Companion to World Literature''. Eds. Theo D'haen, David Damrosch and Djelal Kadir. Routledge. 99-107. Dionýz Ďurišin and a Systemic Theory of World Literature

Durisin's Theory of World Literature
Durisin's theory applied to Indian Literatures

Literary theorists
Comparative literature academics
1929 births
1997 deaths
Slovak literary critics